The crescent-tail hogfish (Bodianus sepiacaudus), also known as the candy cane hogfish or Pacific redstriped hogfish, is a species of wrasse native to the Pacific Ocean from Sulawesi to the Line Islands. This species can reach  in standard length. Juveniles are white and black. Adults are white with four broad red stripes, suffused with black on caudal peduncle and caudal fin. It can be found in the aquarium trade.

The crescent-tail hogfish differs from Bodianus masudai by having white pelvic fins.

References

Crescent-tail hogfish
Taxa named by Martin F. Gomon
Fish described in 2006